7-dimethylallyltryptophan synthase (7-DMATS) is an enzyme with systematic name dimethylallyl-diphosphate:L-tryptophan 7-dimethylallyltransferase. This enzyme catalyses the following chemical reaction

 dimethylallyl diphosphate + L-tryptophan  diphosphate + 7-(3-methylbut-2-enyl)-L-tryptophan

This enzyme is more flexible towards the aromatic substrate than EC 2.5.1.34 (4-dimethylallyltryptophan synthase).

References

External links 

EC 2.5.1